Ronald Lester Van Ryswyk (May 1, 1930 – March 4, 2017) was an American football coach. He was the first head football coach at the Frostburg State University in Frostburg, Maryland, serving for six seasons, from 1961 to 1966, and compiling a record of 21–27.

References

1930 births
2017 deaths
Frostburg State Bobcats football coaches